Wilbur Charles Roach (November 28, 1882 – December 26, 1947) was a Major League Baseball shortstop. He played for the New York Highlanders in 1910–1911, the Washington Senators in 1912, and the Buffalo Buffeds/Blues in 1915. In 177 career games, Roach had 151 hits in 608 at bats for a .248 batting average.

External links

1882 births
1947 deaths
Major League Baseball shortstops
Baseball players from Pennsylvania
New York Highlanders players
Washington Senators (1901–1960) players
Buffalo Blues players
Punxsutawney Policemen players
Sharon Giants players
Youngstown Champs players
Lancaster Red Roses players
Jersey City Skeeters players
Baltimore Orioles (IL) players
Buffalo Bisons (minor league) players
Toronto Maple Leafs (International League) players
Louisville Colonels (minor league) players
Columbus Senators players